Lee Gordon may refer to:

Lee Gordon (promoter), (1923-1963) American-Australian music promoter
Lee Gordon (musician), (1902-1946) an American Jazz musician
Lee Gordon (music label) Australian record label, later known as Leedon
Lee Gordon, character in Red Ball Express (film)

See also
Leo Gordon, (1922-2000) American actor
Leon Gordon (disambiguation)
Gordon Lee (disambiguation)